Bert Clark was an American football coach.

Bert Clark may also refer to:

Bert Clark (motorcycle racer) in 1969 Grand Prix motorcycle racing season

See also
Albert Clark (disambiguation)
Robert Clark (disambiguation)
Hubert Clark, zoologist
Herbert Clark (disambiguation)
Bertie Clark, see Strength athletics in the United Kingdom and Ireland
Bert Clarke, footballer